Edward Richard Dudley (June 10, 1840 - 1913) was a state legislator in North Carolina. He represented Craven County in the North Carolina House of Representatives in 1870 and 1872. He lived in New Bern. He was one of several African American state legislators who represented the area during the Reconstruction era.

See also
African-American officeholders during and following the Reconstruction era
List of first African-American U.S. state legislators

References

Members of the North Carolina House of Representatives
19th-century American politicians

1840 births
1913 deaths